Periyakulam was a Lok Sabha constituency in Tamil Nadu. It was absorbed in Theni Lok Sabha constituency after the 2009 election as part of reorganisation of Lok Sabha seats to reflect the change in population over specific geographic areas. Periyakulam is defunct.

Assembly segments 
Periyakulam Lok Sabha constituency was composed of the following assembly segments:
Periyakulam (now in Theni after 2009)
Theni  (defunct)
Bodinayakkanur (now in Theni after 2009)
Cumbum (now in Theni after 2009)
Andipatti  (now in Theni after 2009)
Sedapatti  (defunct)

Members of the Parliament

The seat was absorbed in Theni Lok Sabha constituency after 2009 election. So Periyakulum seat has become defunct since then.

Election Results

General Election 2004

General Election 1999

General Election 1998

General Election 1996

General Election 1991

General Election 1989

General Election 1984

By-election 1982

General Election 1980

General Election 1977

General Election 1971

General Election 1967

General Election 1962

General Election 1957

General Election 1952

References

See also
 Periyakulam
 List of Constituencies of the Lok Sabha

Former Lok Sabha constituencies of Tamil Nadu
Former constituencies of the Lok Sabha
2008 disestablishments in India
Constituencies disestablished in 2008